Elections are held in Jerusalem to elect the city's mayor. Currently, such elections are regularly scheduled to elect mayors to five-year terms.

General history
Prior to a 1975 national law change, mayors were chosen by the city council (which was elected in a closed list proportional representation system).

Since 1975 law change, mayors have been directly elected in a two round system. Under this system, if no candidate receives at least 40% of the vote in the first round, a runoff election is held between the top-two finishers. The first municipal election to be held under the new law of direct elections for mayor was held in 1978.

1978

The 1978 Jerusalem mayoral election was held 8 November 1978, and saw the reelection of Teddy Kollek to a fourth consecutive term.

While a member of the Israeli Labor Party, Kollek formally ran as an independent.

1983

The 1983 Jerusalem mayoral election was held 25 October 1983, and saw the reelection of Teddy Kollek to a fifth consecutive term.

The election took place among increasing tension between religious and nonreligious Jews in the city. Kollek spoke strongly against what he alleged were intolerant Orthodox factions that were seeking to enforce their lifestyle beliefs upon all Jerusalem. Kollek was assaulted by militantly religious youth ten days prior to the election. Turnout among Arab voters was over 25%. It is believed that many of the Arabs who opted to vote were municipal employees.

Despite efforts of some in the Palestine Liberation Organization to encourage a boycott among the city's East Jerusalem Arab electorate, this electorate came out in greater numbers than they had in previous mayoral elections. The Arab voters who participated strongly supported Kollek, contributing to his strong performance.

Ahead of the election, Kollek was heavily favored for reelection, as a result of his personal popularity. However, the coinciding election for Council of Jerusalem was competitive, and it was seen as uncertain whether the "One Jerusalem" party list which Kollek fielded, would retain the majority it held. Orthodox and right wing political parties, in opposition of the mayor, were vying to flip control of the council. The "One Jerusalem" slate, ultimately, narrowly retained its majority on the council, winning 17 of 31 seats.

Since Kollek exceeded the 40% threshold required to avert a runoff election, no runoff was held.

1989

The 1989 Jerusalem mayoral election was held 28 February 1989, and saw the reelection of Teddy Kollek to a sixth consecutive term.

Kollek ran as the candidate of his own One Jerusalem Party, which was affiliated with the national Israeli Labor Party.

While he won an overwhelming victory in the mayoral election, his party list lost its majority on the Council of Jerusalem. This Council of Jerusalem result was partially attributable to Arab residents of the city voting in lesser numbers than in the recent preceding elections, with more Arabs than usual boycotting the municipal elections. Arab turnout was as small as under 4%. Another contributing factor was backlash from the left wing, who felt that Kollek had given too many compromises to the Haredi. Another contributing factor was a strong turnout of religious Jews, especially with Orthodox Jews, with the election especially seeing an abnormally high turnout of Haredi voters. Kollek had had a majority of the Council be directly aligned with him for the entirety of his mayoralty up to the 1989 election.

1993

The 1993 Jerusalem mayoral election was held 2 November 1993, and saw Likud nominee Ehud Olmert unseat Labor incumbent Teddy Kollek. This ended Kollek's 28-year mayoralty. This also marked the first time in roughly four decades that Jerusalem would have a mayor who was not a member of either the Israeli Labor Party or its predecessor organizations.

1998

The 1998 Jerusalem mayoral election was held on 10 November 1998, and saw the reelection of Likud incumbent Ehud Olmert.

Olmert had been predicted to win a convincing reelection.

2003

The 2003 Jerusalem mayoral election saw the election of United Torah Judaism nominee Uri Lupolianski. Lupolianksi became the first Haredi to serve as mayor of Jerusalem.

Results
Uri Lupolianski (United Torah Judaism) 51.39%
Nir Barkat (Jerusalem Will Succeed) 42.49%
Yigal Almedi (Likud) 3.24%

2008

The 2008 Jerusalem mayoral election was held on 11 November 2008, and saw the election of Nir Barkat.

Candidates
Nir Barkat (Jerusalem Will Succeed), businessman
Dan Biron (Ale Yarok)
Arcadi Gaydamak (Social Justice), billionaire businessman and chairman of Social Justice
Meir Porush (United Torah Judaism), member of the Knesset

Campaigning
Barkat and Porush were the election's front-runners.

Barkat was seen as receiving the support of the city's secular majority, which had been regarded as declining in its share of the electorate.

Porush, a Haredi, was seen as attempting to appeal to a broad swath of the electorate, including both the religious and nonreligious. He centered his candidacy on the issues of education, employment, and housing.

Results

2013

The 2013 Jerusalem mayoral election was held on 2 October 2013, and saw the reelection of Nir Barkat.

2018

The 2018 Jerusalem mayoral election was held on 30 October and 13 November 2018 to elect the mayor of Jerusalem.

With no candidate in the first round meeting the vote threshold of 40% needed to avoid a runoff election, a runoff was held on 13 November. The election was won by Moshe Lion.

Incumbent mayor Nir Barkat did not seek reelection.

Candidates

Ran
Ofer Berkovitch, member of the Council of Jerusalem
Yossi Daitsh, deputy mayor
Ze'ev Elkin, member of the Knesset, minister of Jerusalem affairs, minister of environmental protection
Moshe Lion, member of the Council of Jerusalem, former chairman of the Jerusalem Development Authority, candidate for mayor in 2013 
Avi Salman, former aide of Mayor Nir Barkat

Withdrew
Rachel Azaria, member of the Knesset (endorsed Elkin)
Chaim Epstein, member of the Council of Jerusalem

Results
First round
The results of the first round of voting in Jerusalem, with 254,326 voters participating of 638,065 eligible (a 39.86% turnout), are as follows. Of the 254,326 votes, 248,585 were valid.

Runoff
The results of the second round of voting in Jerusalem are as follows. The voter turnout was 35%.

References